James Curtroppe,  M.A. (Oxon) was the third dean of Peterborough.

He was prebendary of Lincoln Cathedral from 1544 and canon in the 6th prebend at Christ Church Cathedral, Oxford from 1546; and held both positions until his death in 1557.

Notes

Deans of Peterborough
1557 deaths
Alumni of the University of Oxford